Dipolaelaps is a genus of mites in the family Laelapidae.

Species
 Dipolaelaps chimmarogalis Gu, 1983
 Dipolaelaps histis Zhang-Youzhi, Deng-Chenyu, Xue-Qunli, Yu-Yongfang & Wang-Dunqin, 1998
 Dipolaelaps hoi Chang & Hsu
 Dipolaelaps jiangkouensis Gu, 1985
 Dipolaelaps longisetosus Huang, 1985
 Dipolaelaps nepalensis Till, 1988
 Dipolaelaps paraubsunaris Wang & Li, 2002
 Dipolaelaps soriculi Huang, 1985
 Dipolaelaps taibaiensis Huang, 1985
 Dipolaelaps ubsunuris Zemskaya & Piontkovskaya, 1960

References

Laelapidae